USS WST-1 was a 325-ton salvage tug of the United States Navy during World War II.

She was built by Adams & Company, Berrys Bay, Sydney, Australia for the United States Navy in 1945. While travelling up the east coast of Australia, she ran aground on rocks off Susan Gilmore Beach, Newcastle in heavy fog on 27 July 1945 and was holed. Captain W. F. Martin and the eleven crew were rescued.

Citations

1945 ships
Ships built in New South Wales
Tugs of the United States Navy
Shipwrecks of the Hunter Region